Japan participated in the 1962 Asian Games held in Jakarta, Indonesia from August 24, 1962 to September 4, 1962.
This country was ranked 1st with 73 gold medals, 65 silver medals and 23 bronze medals with a total of 152 medals to secure its top spot in the medal tally.

References

Nations at the 1962 Asian Games
1962
Asian Games